This is a list of Montenegrin banks.

Central bank
 Central Bank of Montenegro

Commercial banks

Former banks
Ekos Bank - liquidated
Euromarket Bank - bought by NLB and merged into NLB Montenegrobanka
Jugobanka - bought by Dundee Investments Limited and merged into Criterion Banking Limited
Opportunity Bank, changed name in 2009 to Erste Bank AD Podgorica

References

External links
 Find all banks' branches and ATMs in Montenegro using Maps
 Find short information for each bank in Montenegro

Montenegro
Banks
 
Montenegro